The 1927 SIAA men's basketball tournament took place March 3–March 5, 1927, at Citadel Alumni Gymnasium in Charleston. The Citadel Bulldogs won their first Southern Intercollegiate Athletic Association title, led by head coach Benny Blatt. It was the first SIAA tournament held in Charleston. Georgetown won two upset victories before elimination by Mercer. The Citadel beat Mercer for the title in overtime. They would not beat Mercer again until 2018. It is still the only postseason tournament won by The Citadel.

Bracket

Championship

See also
List of SIAA basketball champions

References

Tournament
Southern Intercollegiate men's basketball tournament
Southern Intercollegiate men's basketball tournament